Mojtaba Rashidi is an Iranian football defender who currently plays for the Omani football club Majees in the Omani premier league.

References

Living people
1996 births
Sanat Naft Abadan F.C. players
Esteghlal Ahvaz players
Esteghlal Khuzestan players
Association football defenders
Iranian footballers